Jomon is an Indian screenwriter and director. He was active in Malayalam cinema between the years 1990 and 2006. His directorial debut film was Samrajyam  and it was a run away hit in Malayalam film industry. This film was dubbed and released in the same name in Andra pradesh, Tamil Nadu and did well in box office.  After working as assistant director in films like Aalkkoottathil Thaniye, Uyarangalil, Adiyozhukkukal, 1921 and Douthyam, Jomon became independent Malayalam cinema director with the 1990 Mammootty film Samrajyam which was one of the highest grossing Malayalam films at the time, it ran for more than 200 days in theaters in Kerala and ran for more than 400 days in Andhra Pradesh which is a record that still remains unbeaten. His other commercially successful film was Jackpot starring Mammootty in the lead role. Most of his films weren't commercial successes .

Filmography

References

External links

20th-century Indian film directors
Indian male screenwriters
Living people
Malayalam film directors
Malayalam screenwriters
Year of birth missing (living people)